Sarah Kerswell (born 6 August 1965) is a British swimmer. Kerswell competed in the women's 400 metre individual medley at the 1980 Summer Olympics. She represented England in the individual medley events and the 400 metres freestyle, at the 1982 Commonwealth Games in Brisbane, Queensland, Australia.

References

External links
 

1965 births
Living people
British female swimmers
Olympic swimmers of Great Britain
Swimmers at the 1980 Summer Olympics
Swimmers at the 1982 Commonwealth Games
Place of birth missing (living people)
Commonwealth Games competitors for England
20th-century British women